FSO may refer to:

Government 
 Federal Protective Service (Russia), responsible for the security of Russian state officials
 Federal Statistical Office (Switzerland)
 Financial Secretary's Office, of the Government of Hong Kong
 Foreign Service Officer, of the United States Foreign Service
 Forest Section Officer, in India

Music 
 Fairfax Symphony Orchestra, in Virginia, United States
 Frankston Symphony Orchestra, in Victoria, Australia
 Fulham Symphony Orchestra, in London
 "F.S.O.", the first single from the Regurgitator album Tu-Plang
 Film Symphony Orchestra, Czech classical orchestra

Transport 
 Fabryka Samochodów Osobowych, a Polish automotive company
 Franklin County State Airport, in Vermont, United States
 Subiaco railway station, in Western Australia

Other uses 
 Fire Support Officer
 Flash shared object
 Floating storage and offloading
 Free-space optical communication
 Flag Service Organization